The Philadelphia Phillies 2012 season was the 130th season in the history of the franchise. The Phillies attempted to win the division title for the 6th year in a row. However, they finished 3rd place in the NL East with a record of 81–81 and missed the playoffs for the first time since 2006.

Offseason
The offseason for the Phillies began on October 7, following their devastating loss in the NLDS to the St. Louis Cardinals. Ryan Howard tore his Achilles tendon, that he would miss the first 3 months of the 2012 season. On November 5, the Phillies signed long-time veteran slugger Jim Thome to a 1-year deal, worth $1.25 million. Additionally, after numerous rumors,  on November 14 the Phillies signed RHP Jonathan Papelbon to a 4-year deal, worth $50 million. The Phillies also added pitcher Dontrelle Willis from the Cincinnati Reds, on a 1-year deal, worth 1 million dollars, but released him toward the end of spring training. Laynce Nix was signed as a free agent and Ty Wigginton was acquired through a trade with the Colorado Rockies to shore up the bench. Several other veteran players including Dave Bush, Joel Piñeiro, Scott Elarton, Lou Montanez, and Scott Podsednik were signed to minor league deals with invitations to spring training.

Regular season

April

Opening Day
The Phillies opened the season in Pittsburgh in a 3-game series with the Pirates. The Phillies begin the season without first baseman Ryan Howard who tore his Achilles tendon in last year's NLDS. Opening Day went as the Phillies drew it up, Roy Halladay threw 8 scoreless innings, and offseason acquisition Jonathan Papelbon retired all 3 batters he faced for a 1–0 Phillies victory. These were the starters on Opening Day for the Phillies:

The Phillies would end up losing the series to Pittsburgh. The Phillies home opener was a disaster, losing to the newly revived Miami Marlins, 6-2. Halladay would end the three game skid, with another solid performance on the mound, as the Phillies won 7–1. The Phillies would end up winning the series the next day, with a 3–1 victory. The Phillies would then go on to trade two wins and losses for the next 8 games. In mid-April, the Phillies began their first major road trip of the season. They began the trip by taking 1 of 3 from the Giants. It was in the second game of the series, when Cliff Lee threw 10 scoreless innings, and ultimately not only did the Phillies lose the game in 11 innings, but Cliff Lee was placed on the 15-day DL with a left external oblique strain. After splitting a 4-game series with San Diego, the Phillies finally won a series against the Diamondbacks, taking 2 of 3. The Phillies finally returned home for a four-game series with the Cubs, where they would split the series. Roy Halladay and Cole Hamels each finished April with 3 wins, and Papelbon was a perfect 8 for 8 on save opportunities. The Phillies finished April with a record of 11–12, their first losing-record month since going 11–15 in June 2009. However, the Phillies have experienced struggle in April before, most notably in 2008, when they would eventually win the World Series, and in 2009, when they would eventually win the National League pennant.

May

The Phillies began May by taking two of three from the division-leading Braves. The only loss came in an 11-inning game, won by a walk-off home run by Chipper Jones.

The Phillies next series against the Washington Nationals began in the offseason. Andrew Feffer, the Nationals chief operating officer, launched a campaign in the offseason for the first home series against the Phillies to "Take Back the Park." In prior years, Nationals Park has been taken over by Phillies fans who could not get tickets for a home game, and the crowd was at times made up of over 80% Phillies fans. The park was publicly referred to by Phillies fans as "Citizens Bank Park South." To avoid this, Feffer allowed only those with Maryland, Virginia, or D.C. addressed credit cards to purchase tickets. Once the series came near, the Nationals released an official "Fans Guide to Natitude Weekend", which explained fans how to approach the series, and gave them guidelines on how to cheer for their home team. Once the series came, it was the Nationals who were in 1st place in the division, and the Phillies who were at the bottom. The first game of the series went into extra innings, with the Nationals taking game 1, 4–3. Charlie Manuel was ejected in the game in the 1st inning, it was his first ejection of the season. The Nationals also took game two of the series by a score of 7–1. However, the Phillies took the third game by a convincing 9–3 victory. In the game, former Phillie Jayson Werth broke his wrist, and while leaving the field, was heckled by a couple of Phillies fans. Following the game in an email to The Washington Post, Werth wrote "I am motivated to get back quickly and see to it personally those people never walk down Broad Street in celebration again." Despite an attempt to be shut out, many Phillies fans still made the trip to Washington, many of them sporting their "Occupy Nationals Park" T-shirts.

Following the series in Washington, the Phillies returned home for a three-game set with the Mets. During that stretch, the Phillies had a difficult time advancing runners that were in scoring position, and as a result, they were swept. It must have been a wake-up call because the Phillies would go on to take 2 of 3 from the Padres, and sweep both the Houston Astros and the Chicago Cubs. The final victory against the Cubs put the Phillies over the .500 mark for the first time since Opening Day. The Phillies would then open inter league play against the Boston Red Sox, and would win the first game 6–4. They would then lose the next two games, and open up another three game set against the Nationals. The outcome of was the same as earlier in Washington, the Phillies would drop the first two games of the series, and then behind Cole Hamels, the Phillies would win the third game to end their losing skid at 4. The Phillies began to pick it up at the end of May; taking 3 of 4 from the St. Louis Cardinals. However, in the 4th game of the series, after giving up a 1st inning grand slam to Yadier Molina, Roy Halladay left the game after 2 innings due to soreness in his shoulder. It would turn out that Halladay would need surgery on his shoulder, and he would miss 6–8 weeks. However, after seeing a second doctor, it was concluded that Halladay may not need surgery, and needed to simply rest for a minimum of three weeks. The Phillies finished May by taking 2 of 3 from the Mets, behind solid pitching performances from Hamels and Cliff Lee. Hamels finished May leading the Majors with 8 wins, and Jonathan Papelbon continued his dominance as a closer, finishing 2nd in the Majors with 14 saves. The Phillies finished May with a 27–25 record, just 3 games out of the 1st place Nationals in the NL East.

June
The Phillies entered June with a record of 27–25 and 3 games behind the Washington Nationals for first place in the East Division. The Phillies started the month by winning the first game to the Miami Marlins, but then lost the next 2. The Phillies struggled in the next series against the Los Angeles Dodgers, losing all 4 games in the series, causing them to slump to a 6-game losing streak and 5.5 games behind the Nationals. The Phillies then won 1 of 3 games against the Baltimore Orioles and 2 of 3 games against the Minnesota Twins. However, they would get swept by the Toronto Blue Jays In game 2 of the series, it looked like Cliff Lee was about to finally get his first win of the season, but the Phillies ended up blowing a 5–2 lead in extra innings. Then the Phillies won 2 of 3 games against the struggling Colorado Rockies In the next series against the Tampa Bay Rays, game 1 was postponed to a double header on the same day as game 3. In game 2 of the series, however, the Phillies took a 2-run lead heading into the top of the 9th inning. The Rays however ended up tying the game, putting the game tied at 6–6 heading into the bottom of 9th inning. In the inning, Jim Thome hit a walk-off home run, giving the Phillies the win and putting Thome in 1st place in career walk-off homers. The Phillies would lose both games the next day, though. In the next series against the Pittsburgh Pirates, the Phillies would win the first 2 games of the series, but then lose the next 2. The Phillies would end the month by getting swept by the Marlins. By the end of July 1, the Phillies were 11 games behind the 1st place Nationals. At the end of the month, The Phillies traded Jim Thome to the Orioles for Class A players Gabriel Lino and Kyle Simon.

July
The Phillies were 36–45 and 11 games behind the first place Nationals after their series against the Marlins. The Phillies started the month by taking 1 of 3 from the New York Mets. The one win, however, came with Cliff Lee finally winning his first game of the season after 13 starts. The streak tied for 5th for the longest winless streak for a pitcher. On July 6th, first baseman Ryan Howard was activated from the disabled list. The Phillies would end the first half by getting swept by the Atlanta Braves. They ended the first half with a disastrous 37–50 mark, their worst since 1997. The Phillies seemed to have woken up in the second half, as they would take 2 of 3 from the Colorado Rockies and Los Angeles Dodgers. Although they only took 1 of 3 from the San Francisco Giants, they would make it up by sweeping the Milwaukee Brewers, all from late comebacks. The sweep was their first 3-game sweep of the year. The sweep, however, got taken back by the Braves as they would get swept by them again because they had a hard time with runners in scoring position. The sweep woke up the Phillies, as they would blow out the Washington Nationals in the 1st game of the series on July 31, 8–0. The Phillies would end up taking 2 of 3 from the Nationals. After the series against the Nationals on August 2, the Phillies were 47–58, 15 and a half games behind the first place Nationals, and 13 game behind the second wild card. Although their playoff chances are slim, the Phillies performance after the all-star break looked promising for next season. Throughout the month, knowing that they will likely not make the postseason, the Phillies made trades with some of their players. One of the trades were Hunter Pence getting traded to the Giants for Nate Schierholtz, Tommy Joseph, and Seth Rosin. Another trade was Shane Victorino getting trading to the Dodgers for 2 pitchers. Pitcher Joe Blanton also got involved in a trade with the Dodgers. The Phillies would also resign Cole Hamels to a six-year, $144 million extension, the second-largest contract for a pitcher in baseball history.

August

The Phillies were 47–58, 15 games behind the first-place Nationals, and 10 games behind the second wild card after their series against the Nationals on August 2. The Phillies started the month by taking 2 of 3 from the Arizona Diamondbacks. The game 3 victory was huge for Ryan Howard, who had struggled since coming off his injury. After getting booed by striking out when the game was tied in the 8th inning with the bases loaded, Ryan Howard came through by hitting an RBI single with the bases loaded in the ninth inning to win the game and the series. The victory also put them out of last place in the NL East for the first time since June 27. The Phillies then took 1 of 3 from the Braves, a team that they got swept by in the past 2 series. In game 1 of the series, the Phillies saw their sellout streak end when the Phillies did not have a sell-out crowd. This ended their streak at 257 games, the third-longest sellout streak in MLB history. The Phillies then took 2 of 3 from the St. Louis Cardinals and came back from 3 runs down to win game 3 in extra innings. The Phillies then also took 2 of 3 from the Miami Marlins. The Phillies then split the series at 2–2 against the Milwaukee Brewers and Cincinnati Reds. After their game 4 win against the Reds, the Phillies moved up to third place in the division for the first time since April 12. The Phillies then pulled off a three-game sweep of the Nationals, marking their second three-game sweep of the season. The Phillies would however take just 1 of 3 from the New York Mets. To finish the month, the Phillies would pull off a comeback win against the Braves in game 1 on August 31. The Phillies ended up taking 2 of 3 from that series. They could have swept the series, but the Phillies blew a 7–3 lead in the bottom of the 9th inning in game 3. The Phillies finished August by going 17–12, their best month of the season overall so far. However, Carlos Ruiz, who had been the star of the Phillies with his remarkable performance this season, had to sit out for 4–6 weeks because of a fractured knee that took a beating throughout the month. Ruiz was replaced by Erik Kratz due to catcher Brian Schneider also suffering an injury. This month also saw a huge improvement by Kyle Kendrick. After Charlie Manuel got really disappointed in an awful outing by Kyle in a 12–6 loss when he allowed 6 runs, he has been the hottest Phillies's pitcher since. Right away in his next outing, he shut the Miami Marlins out, allowing no runs. He did the same in his next outing against a normally strong Milwaukee Brewers offense. Although in his next outing Kyle allowed a 2-run home run against the Washington Nationals, Kendrick received his 3rd win in a row when the Phillies won 4–2. Kendrick picked up his fourth win in a row when the Phillies won 3–2 against the New York Mets.

September/ October

The Phillies were 64–70 and were 8 games behind the Second Wild Card team St. Louis Cardinals after their series with the Braves on September 2. The Phillies will try to make an impressive late run to make the Wild Card. The Phillies started the month of September by taking 2 of 3 from the Cincinnati Reds. Then, the Phillies caught fire in the wild card standings, by sweeping both the Colorado Rockies and Miami Marlins in a 3-game series to climb back up above .500 for the first time since June 3, partly due to strong performances by Jimmy Rollins shortly after coming back after getting benched when he did not hustle after a pop-up on August 30. Meanwhile, the teams ahead of them struggled, with the Pittsburgh Pirates losing 6 in a row and the Cardinals and Los Angeles Dodgers losing 6 of their last 7 games. As a result, the Phillies were just 3 games behind the Cardinals on September 12. However, just as it seemed like the Phillies were going to make an improbable run to the playoffs, disaster stroke in the next series against the Houston Astros. Mainly due to bad pitching performances, the Phillies lost 3 of 4 to the last-place Astros and were 4 games back after the series. This was also when the Phillies were eliminated from winning the division with a 6–7 loss on August 16. However, the Phillies tried to rebound. They then had their revenge on the New York Mets for the tough losses they gave the Phils this season by sweeping them. This includes a come-from-behind 3–2 when Ryan Howard hit a 2-run home run when the Phillies were down to their final out and a huge blowout 16–1 win when the Phillies scored 8 runs on the road in the first inning for the first time since 1912. Despite the sweep, the Phillies were unable to pick up any games as the Cardinals started getting hot around this time. Then in the next series against the Atlanta Braves, although they would win the first game to climb back to 3 games behind the Cardinals, they would lose the final 2 games which sunk them to 5 games behind the Cardinals and majorly damaged their playoff hopes. However, in game 2 of the series, Ryan Howard hit his 300th career home run after 1,093 games, becoming the second fastest player to hit the 300th homer. The Phillies were unable to keep their now very slim playoff chances alive by taking just 1 of 3 from the Washington Nationals. However, Darin Ruf, who recently joined the Phillies from the minor leagues, saw that his first hit was also his first home run.  Their playoff chances then ended for good when the Phillies loss the first game of the next series against the Marlins on September 28. The Phillies would then finish the year by winning the next 2 games against the Marlins, but would win only 1 of 3 from the Nationals. The Phillies would finish the year 81–81. Although it was impressive to recover from 14 games behind .500 in just half a season, this season was their first non-winning season since 2002. The Phillies already fired first base coach Sam Perlozzo, bench coach Pete Mackanin and hitting coach Greg Gross.

Season standings

NL East standings

NL Wild Card

Record vs. opponents

9-9

Game log

|- style="background:#bfb;"
| 1 || April 5 || @ Pirates || 1–0  || Halladay (1–0) || Bédard (0–1)  || Papelbon (1) || 39,585 || 1–0
|- style="background:#fbb;"
| 2 || April 7 || @ Pirates || 1–2 (10) || Cruz (1–0) || Blanton (0–1) || || 38,885 || 1–1
|- style="background:#fbb;"
| 3 || April 8 || @ Pirates || 4–5 || Hanrahan (1–0) || Herndon (0–1) || || 19,856 || 1–2
|- style="background:#fbb;"
| 4 || April 9 || Marlins || 2–6 || Sánchez (1–0) || Hamels (0–1) || || 45,574 || 1–3
|- style="background:#bfb;"
| 5 || April 11 || Marlins || 7–1 || Halladay (2–0) || Johnson (0–2) || || 45,359 || 2–3
|- style="background:#bfb;"
| 6 || April 12 || Marlins || 3–1 || Blanton (1–1) || Buehrle (0–2) || Papelbon (2) || 44,751 || 3–3
|- style="background:#fbb;"
| 7 || April 13 || Mets || 2–5 || Dickey  (2–0) || Lee (0–1) || || 45,429 || 3–4
|- style="background:#fbb;"
| 8 || April 14 || Mets || 0–5 || Niese (2–0) || Worley (0–1) || || 45,750 || 3–5
|- style="background:#bfb;"
| 9 || April 15 || Mets || 8–2 || Hamels (1–1) || Ramírez (1–1) || || 45,829 || 4–5
|- style="background:#bfb;"
| 10 || April 16 || @ Giants || 5–2 || Halladay (3–0) || Lincecum (0–2) || Papelbon (3) || 41,136 || 5–5
|- style="background:#fbb;"
| 11 || April 17 || @ Giants || 2–4 || Bumgarner (2–1) || Blanton (1–2) || Casilla (1) || 41,101 || 5–6
|- style="background:#fbb;"
| 12 || April 18 || @ Giants || 0–1 (11) || Hensley (1–0) || Bastardo (0–1) || || 41,860 || 5–7
|- style="background:#bfb;"
| 13 || April 19 || @ Padres || 2–0 || Worley (1–1) || Wieland (0–2) || Papelbon (4) || 17,573 || 6–7
|- style="background:#bfb;"
| 14 || April 20 || @ Padres || 4–1 || Hamels (2–1) || Vólquez (0–2) || Papelbon (5) || 23,748 || 7–7
|- style="background:#fbb;"
| 15 || April 21 || @ Padres || 1–5 || Luebke (2–1) || Halladay (3–1) || || 31,437 || 7–8
|- style="background:#fbb;"
| 16 || April 22 || @ Padres || 1–6 || Bass (1–2) || Blanton (1–3) || || 26,759 || 7–9
|- style="background:#fbb;"
| 17 || April 23 || @  Diamondbacks || 5–9 || Miley (2–0) || Kendrick (0–1) || || 21,195 || 7–10
|- style="background:#bfb;"
| 18 || April 24 || @  Diamondbacks || 8–5 || Worley (2–1) || Collmenter (0–2) || Papelbon (6) || 24,213 || 8–10
|- style="background:#bfb;"
| 19 || April 25 || @ Diamondbacks || 7–2 || Hamels (3–1) || Cahill (1–2) || || 25,934 || 9–10
|- style="background:#fbb;"
| 20 || April 27 || Cubs || 1–5 || Maholm (2–2) || Halladay (3–2) || Dolis (1) || 45,261 || 9–11
|- style="background:#bfb;"
| 21 || April 28 || Cubs || 5–2 || Blanton (2–3) || Wells (0–1) || Papelbon (7) || 45,196 || 10–11
|- style="background:#fbb;"
| 22 || April 29 || Cubs || 1–5 || Garza (2–1) || Kendrick (0–2) || || 45,550 || 10–12
|- style="background:#bfb;"
| 23 || April 30 || Cubs || 6–4 || Qualls (1–0) || Maine (0–1) || Papelbon (8) || 45,397 || 11–12
|-

|- style="background:#bfb;"
| 24 || May 1 || @ Braves || 4–2 || Bastardo (1–1) || Venters (2–1) || Papelbon (9) || 21,640 || 12–12
|- style="background:#fbb;"
| 25 || May 2 || @ Braves || 13–15 (11) || Durbin (1–0) || Sanches (0–1) || || 26,504 || 12–13
|- style="background:#bfb;"
| 26 || May 3 || @ Braves || 4–0 || Blanton (3–3) || Delgado (2–3) || || 24,015 || 13–13
|- style="background:#fbb;"
| 27 || May 4 || @ Nationals || 3–4 (11) || Perry (1–0) || Schwimer (0–1) || || 34,377 || 13–14
|- style="background:#fbb;"
| 28 || May 5 || @ Nationals || 1–7 || Gonzalez (3–1) || Worley (2–2) || || 39,496 || 13–15
|- style="background:#bfb;"
| 29 || May 6 || @ Nationals || 9–3 || Hamels (4–1) || Zimmermann (1–3) || || 33,058 || 14–15
|- style="background:#fbb;"
| 30 || May 7 || Mets || 2–5 || Byrdak (1–0) || Papelbon (0–1) || Francisco (8) || 44,365 || 14–16
|- style="background:#fbb;"
| 31 || May 8 || Mets || 4–7 || Acosta (1–2) || Qualls (1–1) || Rauch (1) || 43,821 || 14–17
|- style="background:#fbb;"
| 32 || May 9 || Mets || 6–10 || Byrdak (2–0) || Kendrick (0–3) || || 43,840 || 14–18
|- style="background:#bfb;"
| 33 || May 11 || Padres || 7–3 || Worley (3–2) || Richard (1–5) || || 44,056 || 15–18
|- style="background:#fbb;"
| 34 || May 12 || Padres || 1–2 || Vólquez (2–2) || Halladay (3–3) || Thayer (3) || 45,542 || 15–19
|- style="background:#bfb;"
| 35 || May 13 || Padres || 3–2 || Hamels (5–1) || Suppan (2–1) || Papelbon (10) || 45,442 || 16–19
|- style="background:#bfb;"
| 36 || May 14 || Astros || 5–1 || Blanton (4–3) || Harrell (2–3) || || 43,824 || 17–19
|- style="background:#bfb;"
| 37 || May 15 || Astros || 4–3 (10) || Diekman (1–0) || Myers (0–1) || || 43,781 || 18–19
|- style="background:#bfb;"
| 38 || May 16 || @ Cubs || 9–2 || Contreras (1–0) || Camp (2–2) || || 38,678 || 19–19
|- style="background:#bfb;"
| 39 || May 17 || @ Cubs || 8–7 || Halladay (4–3) || Volstad (0–6) || Papelbon (11) || 37,986 || 20–19
|- style="background:#bfb;"
| 40 || May 18 || Red Sox || 6–4 || Hamels (6–1) || Bard (3–5) || Papelbon (12) || 45,205 || 21–19
|- style="background:#fbb;"
| 41 || May 19 || Red Sox || 5–7 || Lester (3–3) || Blanton (4–4) || Aceves (9) || 45,656 || 21–20
|- style="background:#fbb;"
| 42 || May 20 || Red Sox || 1–5 || Beckett (4–4) || Lee (0–2) || || 45,586 || 21–21
|- style="background:#fbb;"
| 43 || May 21 || Nationals || 1–2 || Gonzalez (6–1) || Kendrick (0–4) || Burnett (2) || 43,787 || 21–22
|- style="background:#fbb;"
| 44 || May 22 || Nationals || 2–5 || Zimmermann (3–4) || Halladay (4–4) || Clippard (1) || 45,569 || 21–23
|- style="background:#bfb;"
| 45 || May 23 || Nationals || 4–1 || Hamels (7–1) || Jackson (1–2) || || 43,926 || 22–23
|- style="background:#bfb;"
| 46 || May 24 || @ Cardinals || 10–9 || Valdés (1–0) || Salas (0–3) || Papelbon (13) || 40,135 || 23–23
|- style="background:#bfb;"
| 47 || May 25 || @ Cardinals || 5–3 (10) || Valdés (2–0) || Motte (3–2) || Papelbon (14) || 43,375 || 24–23
|- style="background:#bfb;"
| 48 || May 26 || @ Cardinals || 4–0 || Kendrick (1–4) || García (3–3) || || 44,476 || 25–23
|- style="background:#fbb;"
| 49 || May 27 || @ Cardinals || 3–8 || Wainwright (4–5) || Halladay (4–5) || || 42,659 || 25–24
|- style="background:#bfb;"
| 50 || May 28 || @ Mets || 8–4 || Hamels (8–1) || Parnell (1–1) || || 32,122 || 26–24
|- style="background:#fbb;"
| 51 || May 29 || @ Mets || 3–6 || Hefner (1–2) || Blanton (4–5) || Francisco (14) || 25,487 || 26–25
|- style="background:#bfb;"
| 52 || May 30 || @ Mets || 10–6 || Bastardo (2–1) || Rauch (3–4) || || 30,064 || 27–25
|-

|- style="background:#bfb;"
| 53 || June 1 || Marlins || 6–4 || Kendrick (2–4) || Buehrle (5–5) || Papelbon (15) || 44,497 || 28–25
|- style="background:#fbb;"
| 54 || June 2 || Marlins || 4–5 || Nolasco (6–3) || Hamels (8–2) || Bell (11) || 45,509 || 28–26
|- style="background:#fbb;"
| 55 || June 3 || Marlins || 1–5 || Zambrano (4–3) || Blanton (4–6) || Bell (12) || 45,356 || 28–27
|- style="background:#fbb;"
| 56 || June 4 || Dodgers || 3–4 || Belisario (1–0) || Papelbon (0–2) || Jansen (7) || 45,572 || 28–28
|- style="background:#fbb;"
| 57 || June 5 || Dodgers || 1–2 || Billingsley (3–4) || Lee (0–3) || Jansen (8) || 43,989 || 28–29
|- style="background:#fbb;"
| 58 || June 6 || Dodgers || 5–6 || Capuano (8–2) || Kendrick (2–5) || Jansen (9) || 44,216 || 28–30
|- style="background:#fbb;"
| 59 || June 7 || Dodgers || 3–8 || Harang (5–3) || Hamels (8–3) || || 44,096 || 28–31
|- style="background:#bfb;"
| 60 || June 8 || @ Orioles || 9–6 || Blanton (5–6) || Arrieta (2–8) || Papelbon (16) || 40,459 || 29–31
|- style="background:#fbb;"
| 61 || June 9 || @ Orioles || 4–6 (12) || Ayala (2–1) || Rosenberg (0–1) || || 46,611 || 29–32
|- style="background:#fbb;"
| 62 || June 10 || @ Orioles || 4–5 (10) || O'Day (4–0) || Savery (0–1) || || 45,267 || 29–33
|- style="background:#fbb;"
| 63 || June 12 || @ Twins || 7–11 || Blackburn (3–4) || Kendrick (2–6) || || 32,622 || 29–34
|- style="background:#bfb;"
| 64 || June 13 || @ Twins || 9–8 || Hamels (9–3) || Walters (2–2) || Papelbon (17) || 32,581 || 30–34
|- style="background:#bfb;"
| 65 || June 14 || @ Twins || 6–1 || Blanton  (6–6) || Diamond (5–2) || || 32,205 || 31–34
|- style="background:#fbb;"
| 66 || June 15 || @ Blue Jays || 0–3 || Villanueva (2–0) || Worley (3–3) || Janssen (6) || 28,266 || 31–35
|- style="background:#fbb;"
| 67 || June 16 || @ Blue Jays || 5–6 (10) || Cordero (2–4) || Savery (0–2) || || 42,070 || 31–36
|- style="background:#fbb;"
| 68 || June 17 || @ Blue Jays || 2–6 || Cecil (1–0) || Kendrick (2–7) || || 45,060 || 31–37
|- style="background:#bfb;"
| 69 || June 19 || Rockies || 7–2 || Hamels (10–3) || Outman (0–3) || || 44,329 || 32–37
|- style="background:#bfb;"
| 70 || June 20 || Rockies || 7–6 || Papelbon (1–2) || Betancourt (1–3) || || 43,729 || 33–37
|- style="background:#fbb;"
| 71 || June 21 || Rockies || 1–4 || Roenicke (2–0) || Worley (3–4) || Betancourt (11) || 43,805 || 33–38
|- style="background:#bbb;"
| – || June 22 || Rays || colspan=6 | Postponed (rain); Makeup: June 24
|- style="background:#bfb;"
| 72 || June 23 || Rays || 7–6 || Papelbon (2–2) || McGee (2–2) || || 44,878 || 34–38
|- style="background:#fbb;"
| 73 || June 24  || Rays || 2–3 || Price (10–4) || Bastardo (2–2) || Rodney (21) || 44,785 || 34–39
|- style="background:#fbb;"
| 74 || June 24  || Rays || 3–7 || Gomes (2–2) || Lee (0–4) || || 44,088 || 34–40
|- style="background:#bfb;"
| 75 || June 25 || Pirates || 8–3 || Blanton (7–6) || Karstens (0–2) || || 44,721 || 35–40
|- style="background:#bfb;"
| 76 || June 26 || Pirates || 5–4 || Worley (4–4) || Bédard (4–8) || Papelbon (18) || 45,096 || 36–40
|- style="background:#fbb;"
| 77 || June 27 || Pirates || 7–11 || McDonald (7–3) || Valdés (2–1) || || 44,057 || 36–41
|- style="background:#fbb;"
| 78 || June 28 || Pirates || 4–5 || Burnett (9–2) || Kendrick (2–8) || Hanrahan (20) || 44,521 || 36–42
|- style="background:#fbb;"
| 79 || June 29 || @ Marlins || 2–6 || Johnson (5–5) || Lee (0–5) || || 28,246 || 36–43
|- style="background:#fbb;"
| 80 || June 30 || @ Marlins || 2–3 || Buehrle (7–8) || Hamels (10–4) || Bell (16) || 31,311 || 36–44
|-

|- style="background:#fbb;"
| 81 || July 1 || @ Marlins  || 2–5 || Nolasco (7–6) || Blanton (7–7) || Bell (17) || 31,727 || 36–45
|- style="background:#fbb;"
| 82 || July 3 || @ Mets || 1–11 || Niese (7–3) || Worley (4–5) || || 42,516 || 36–46
|- style="background:#bfb;"
| 83 || July 4 || @ Mets || 9–2 || Lee  (1–5) || Young (2–2) || || 28,687 || 37–46
|- style="background:#fbb;"
| 84 || July 5 || @ Mets || 5–6 || Parnell (2–1) || Papelbon (2–3) || || 28,409 || 37–47
|- style="background:#fbb;"
| 85 || July 6 || Braves || 0–5 || Hudson (7–4) || Bastardo (2–3)  || || 44,441 || 37–48
|- style="background:#fbb;"
| 86 || July 7 || Braves || 3–6 || Hanson (10–5) || Blanton (7–8) || Kimbrel (24) || 44,797 || 37–49
|- style="background:#fbb;"
| 87 || July 8 || Braves || 3–4 || Jurrjens (3–2) || Valdés (2–2) || Kimbrel (25) || 43,881 || 37–50
|- style="background:#bbcaff;"
| – || July 10 ||colspan="7" |2012 Major League Baseball All-Star Game in Kansas City, Missouri
|- style="background:#fbb;"
| 88 || July 13 || @ Rockies || 2–6 || Friedrich (5–6) || Lee (1–6) || || 33,346 || 37–51
|- style="background:#bfb;"
| 89 || July 14 || @ Rockies || 8–5 || Worley (5–5) || Guthrie (3–9) || Papelbon (19) || 35,151 || 38–51
|- style="background:#bfb;"
| 90 || July 15 || @ Rockies || 5–1 || Hamels (11–4) || Pomeranz (1–4) || || 25,685 || 39–51
|- style="background:#bfb;"
| 91 || July 16 || @ Dodgers || 3–2 || Blanton (8–8) || Eovaldi (1–6) || Papelbon (20) || 32,238 || 40–51
|- style="background:#bfb;"
| 92 || July 17 || @ Dodgers || 3–2 || Kendrick (3–8) || Belisario (3–1) || Papelbon (21) || 53,498 || 41–51
|- style="background:#fbb;"
| 93 || July 18 || @ Dodgers || 3–5 (12) || Wright (4–2) || Diekman (1–1)  || || 39,955 || 41–52
|- style="background:#fbb;"
| 94 || July 20 || Giants || 2–7 || Lincecum (4–10) || Worley (5–6) || || 44,205 || 41–53
|- style="background:#fbb;"
| 95 || July 21 || Giants || 5–6 (10) || Romo (3–1) || Papelbon (2–4) || Casilla (24) || 45,989 || 41–54
|- style="background:#bfb;"
| 96 || July 22 || Giants || 4–3 (12) || Kendrick (4–8) || Penny (0–1) || || 44,551 || 42–54
|- style="background:#bfb;"
| 97 || July 23 || Brewers || 7–6 || Savery (1–2) || Rodríguez (2–5) || || 43,717 || 43–54
|- style="background:#bfb;"
| 98 || July 24 || Brewers || 7–6 || Schwimer (1–1) || Loe (4–4) || Papelbon (22) || 43,745 || 44–54
|- style="background:#bfb;"
| 99 || July 25 || Brewers || 7–6 (10) || Schwimer (2–1) || Rodríguez (2–6) || || 44,715 || 45–54
|- style="background:#fbb;"
| 100 || July 27 || @ Braves || 1–6 || Sheets (3–0) || Hamels (11–5) || || 42,239 || 45–55
|- style="background:#fbb;"
| 101 || July 28 || @ Braves || 1–2  || Minor (6–7) || Blanton (8–9) || Kimbrel (30) || 39,886 || 45–56
|- style="background:#fbb;"
| 102 || July 29 || @ Braves || 2–6 || Hudson (10–4) || Halladay (4–6) || || 23,726 || 45–57
|- style="background:#bfb;"
| 103 || July 31 || @ Nationals || 8–0 || Lee (2–6) || Strasburg (11–5) || || 30,167 || 46–57
|-

|- style="background:#bfb;"
| 104 || August 1 || @ Nationals || 3–2 || Worley (6–6) || Jackson (6–7) || Papelbon (23) || 23,777 || 47–57
|- style="background:#fbb;"
| 105 || August 2 || @ Nationals || 0–3 || Detwiler (6–4) || Hamels (11–6) || Clippard (21) || 28,825 || 47–58
|- style="background:#fbb;"
| 106 || August 3 || Diamondbacks || 2–4 || Kennedy (10–8) || Kendrick (4–9) || Putz (20) || 43,766 || 47–59
|- style="background:#bfb;"
| 107 || August 4 || Diamondbacks || 3–0 || Halladay (5–6) || Saunders (5–8) || Papelbon (24) || 43,762 || 48–59
|- style="background:#bfb;"
| 108 || August 5 || Diamondbacks || 5–4 || Papelbon (3–4) || Collmenter (3–3) || || 43,741 || 49–59
|- style="background:#fbb;"
| 109 || August 6 || Braves || 1–6 || Sheets (4–1) || Worley (6–7) || || 41,665 || 49–60
|- style="background:#bfb;"
| 110 || August 7 || Braves || 3–0  || Hamels (12–6) || Minor (6–8) || || 42,660 || 50–60
|- style="background:#fbb;"
| 111 || August 8 || Braves || 6–12 || Durbin (4–1) || Bastardo (2–4) || || 41,501 || 50–61
|- style="background:#bfb;"
| 112 || August 10 || Cardinals || 3–1 || Halladay (6–6) || Browning (0–1) || Papelbon (25) || 43,122 || 51–61
|- style="background:#fbb;"
| 113 || August 11 || Cardinals || 1–4 || Westbrook (12–8) || Lee (2–7) || Motte (26) || 44,233 || 51–62
|- style="background:#bfb;"
| 114 || August 12 || Cardinals || 8–7 (11) || Horst (1–0) || Browning (0–2) || || 42,877 || 52–62
|- style="background:#bfb;"
| 115 || August 13 || @ Marlins || 4–0 || Hamels (13–6) || Eovaldi (3–8) || || 23,309 || 53–62
|- style="background:#bfb;"
| 116 || August 14 || @ Marlins || 1–0 || Kendrick (5–9) || Johnson (7–9) || Papelbon (26) || 23,879 || 54–62
|- style="background:#fbb;"
| 117 || August 15 || @ Marlins || 2–9 || Buehrle (10–11) || Halladay (6–7) || || 22,450 || 54–63
|- style="background:#fbb;"
| 118 || August 16 || @ Brewers || 4–7 || Hernández (4–1) || Lindblom (2–3) || Henderson (3) || 30,117 || 54–64
|- style="background:#fbb;"
| 119 || August 17 || @ Brewers || 2–6 || Gallardo (12–8) || Worley (6–8) || || 39,163 || 54–65
|- style="background:#bfb;"
| 120 || August 18 || @ Brewers || 4–3 || Hamels (14–6) || Fiers (6–6) || Papelbon (27) || 43,386 || 55–65
|- style="background:#bfb;"
| 121 || August 19 || @ Brewers || 8–0 || Kendrick (6–9) || Wolf (3–10) || || 42,224 || 56–65
|- style="background:#bfb;"
| 122 || August 20 || Reds || 12–5 || Halladay (7–7) || Leake (5–8) || || 44,341 || 57–65
|- style="background:#fbb;"
| 123 || August 21 || Reds || 4–5 || Broxton (3–3) || Papelbon (3–5) || Chapman (30) || 45,091 || 57–66
|- style="background:#fbb;"
| 124 || August 22 || Reds || 2–3 || Arroyo (10–7) || Worley (6–9) || Chapman (31) || 41,794 || 57–67
|- style="background:#bfb;"
| 125 || August 23 || Reds || 4–3 (11) || Valdés (3–2) || Simón (2–2) ||  || 41,972 || 58–67
|- style="background:#bfb;"
| 126 || August 24 || Nationals || 4–2 || Kendrick (7–9) || Jackson (7–9) || Papelbon (28) || 42,096 || 59–67
|- style="background:#bfb;"
| 127 || August 25 || Nationals || 4–2 || Halladay (8–7) || Gonzalez (16–7) || Papelbon (29) || 44,256 || 60–67
|- style="background:#bfb;"
| 128 || August 26 || Nationals || 4–1 || Lee (3–7) || Zimmermann (9–8) || Lindblom (1) || 44,653 || 61–67
|- style="background:#fbb;"
| 129 || August 28 || Mets || 5–9 (10) || Parnell (4–3) || Rosenberg (0–2) ||  || 41,227 || 61–68
|- style="background:#fbb;"
| 130 || August 29 || Mets || 2–3 || Harvey (3–3) || Cloyd (0–1) || Francisco (22) || 42,882 || 61–69
|- style="background:#bfb;"
| 131 || August 30 || Mets || 3–2 || Kendrick (8–9) || Niese (10–8) || Papelbon (30) || 43,141 || 62–69
|- style="background:#bfb;"
| 132 || August 31 || @ Braves || 8–5 (10) || Lindblom (3–3) || Martínez (5–4) || Papelbon (31) || 31,203 || 63–69
|-

|- style="background:#bfb;"
| 133 || September 1 || @ Braves || 5–1 || Lee (4–7) || Hudson (13–5) || || 44,749 || 64–69
|- style="background:#fbb;"
| 134 || September 2 || @ Braves || 7–8 || Moylan (1–0) || Papelbon (3–6) || || 36,394 || 64–70
|- style="background:#bfb;"
| 135 || September 3 || @ Reds || 4–2 || Cloyd (1–1) || Cueto (17–7) || Aumont (1) || 22,487 || 65–70
|- style="background:#fbb;"
| 136 || September 4 || @ Reds || 1–2 || Latos (12–4) || Kendrick (8–10) || Chapman (35) || 17,806 || 65–71
|- style="background:#bfb;"
| 137 || September 5 || @ Reds || 6–2 || Halladay (9–7) || Leake (7–9) || || 19,267 || 66–71
|- style="background:#bfb;"
| 138 || September 7 || Rockies  || 3–2 || Papelbon (4–6) || Harris (1–1) || || 42,028 || 67–71
|- style="background:#bbb;"
| – || September 8 || Rockies || colspan=6 | Postponed (rain); Makeup: September 9
|- style="background:#bfb;"
| 139 || September 9  || Rockies || 3–2 || Papelbon (5–6) || Belisle (3–6) || || 41,813 || 68–71
|- style="background:#bfb;"
| 140 || September 9  || Rockies || 7–4 || Rosenberg (1–2) || Roenicke (4–2) || Papelbon (32) || 40,394 || 69–71
|- bgcolor="#bbffbb"
| 141 || September 10 || Marlins || 3–1 || Kendrick (9–10) || LeBlanc (2–4) || Bastardo (1) || 41,505 || 70–71
|- bgcolor="#bbffbb"
| 142 || September 11 || Marlins || 9–7 || Halladay (10–7) || Eovaldi (4–12) || Papelbon (33) || 42,028 || 71–71
|- bgcolor="#bbffbb"
| 143 || September 12 || Marlins || 3–1 || Lee (5–7) || Johnson (8–12) || Papelbon (34) || 42,178 || 72–71
|- bgcolor="#ffbbbb"
| 144 || September 13 || @ Astros || 4–6 || Wright (1–2) || Aumont (0–1) || López (5) || 13,028 || 72–72
|- bgcolor="#bbffbb"
| 145 || September 14 || @ Astros || 12–6 || Hamels (15–6) || González (2–1) || || 17,535 || 73–72
|- bgcolor="#ffbbbb"
| 146 || September 15 || @ Astros || 0–5 || Keuchel (2–7) || Kendrick (9–11) || || 20,419 || 73–73
|- bgcolor="#ffbbbb"
| 147 || September 16 || @ Astros || 6–7 || Wright (2–2) || Bastardo (2–5) || López (6) || 17,438 || 73–74
|- bgcolor="#bbffbb"
| 148 || September 17 || @ Mets || 3–1 || Lee (6–7) || Dickey (18–6) || Papelbon (35) || 20,527 || 74–74
|- bgcolor="#bbbbbb"
| – || September 18 || @ Mets || colspan=6 | Postponed (rain); Makeup: September 20
|- bgcolor="#bbffbb"
| 149 || September 19 || @ Mets || 3–2 || Horst (2–0) || Edgin (1–2) || Papelbon (36) || 21,741 || 75–74
|- bgcolor="#bbffbb"
| 150 || September 20 || @ Mets || 16–1 || Cloyd (2–1) || Hefner (2–7) || || 20,010 || 76–74
|- bgcolor="#bbffbb"
| 151 || September 21 || Braves || 6–2 || Kendrick (10–11) || Hanson (12–9) ||  || 44,052 || 77–74
|- bgcolor="#ffbbbb"
| 152 || September 22 || Braves || 2–8 || Minor (10–10) || Halladay (10–8) || || 45,377 || 77–75
|- bgcolor="#ffbbbb"
| 153 || September 23 || Braves || 1–2 || Hudson (16–6) || Lee (6–8) || Kimbrel (39) || 43,968 || 77–76
|- bgcolor="#bbffbb"
| 154 || September 25 || Nationals || 6–3 || Hamels (16–6) || Detwiler (10–7) || Papelbon (37) || 42,304 || 78–76
|- bgcolor="#ffbbbb"
| 155 || September 26 || Nationals || 4–8 || Lannan (4–0) || Kendrick (10–12) || || 41,440 || 78–77
|- bgcolor="#ffbbbb"
| 156 || September 27 || Nationals || 3–7 || Gonzalez (21–8) || Cloyd (2–2) || || 44,070 || 78–78
|- bgcolor="#ffbbbb"
| 157 || September 28 || @ Marlins || 1–2 || Cishek (5–2) || Lindblom (3–4) || || 28,201 || 78–79
|- bgcolor="#bbffbb"
| 158 || September 29 || @ Marlins || 9–5 || Halladay (11–8) || Nolasco (12–13) || || 30,202 || 79–79
|- bgcolor="#bbffbb"
| 159 || September 30 || @ Marlins || 4–1 || Hamels (17–6) || Eovaldi (4–13) || Papelbon (38) || 28,317 || 80–79
|-

|- bgcolor="#bbffbb"
| 160 || October 1 || @ Nationals || 2–0 || Kendrick (11–12) || Lannan (4–1) || Aumont (2) || 35,387 || 81–79
|- bgcolor="#ffbbbb"
| 161 || October 2 || @ Nationals || 2–4 || Duke (1–0) || Lindblom (3–5) || Storen (4) || 33,546 || 81–80
|- bgcolor="#ffbbbb"
| 162 || October 3 || @ Nationals || 1–5 || Jackson (10–11) || Lee (6–9) ||  || 37,075 ||81–81
|-

Roster
All players who made an appearance for the Phillies during 2012 are included.

Farm system

External links
2012 Philadelphia Phillies season at Baseball Reference
Philadelphia Phillies' official website

Philadelphia Phillies seasons
Philadelphia Phillies
Philadelphia Phillies